Suffocation in ash was a method of capital punishment in which the individual is suffocated by being in some way immersed into ash to cause asphyxiation. As an execution practice, it is attested from ancient Persia and postclassic Mesoamerica.

Ancient Persia
In ancient Persia, there existed an execution method where a tower/room was filled with ash, into which the condemned person was plunged. Wheels were constantly turned while he was alive, making the ash whirl about, and the person died by gradual suffocation as he inhaled the ash.

Reputedly, the first to suffer this punishment was Sogdianus. He killed his half-brother Xerxes II around 423 BC. Another half-brother, Ochus (later called Darius II) rebelled against him, and killed Sogdianus in this manner because he had promised Sogdianus he would not die by the sword, by poison or by hunger. At the instigation of his wife Parysatis, Darius II had his brother, Arsites, executed in the same manner for rebellion, along with Arsites' general Artyphius. Some time later, a rebelling general Pisuthnes met the same fate.

In about 162 BC, Menelaus, Jewish high priest at Jerusalem was apparently put to death in this manner by Lysias, regent for Antiochus V, on charges of rebellion.

Texcoco
Nezahualcoyotl, a 15th-century, pre-Columbian, non-Aztec Acolhuan ruler of Texcoco in modern Mexico, designed a law code that is partially preserved. Those who had engaged in the active role of homosexual anal intercourse were suffocated in a heap of ash. Their passive partners had their intestines pulled out, then their bodies were filled with ash, and finally, were burnt.

See also
 Grain entrapment

References

Execution methods